Black Thorn is a DC Comics character. She first appeared in Vigilante #45 (September 1987) and was created by Paul Kupperberg and Tod Smith.

Fictional character biography
Elizabeth Thorne used to have a life as a partying socialite, basically a rich drunk. Her brother forces her into rehab. While happy not to be involved with the bottle anymore, she misses the thrill of life. She joins up with the CIA but soon feels constrained by the need to operate within the law.

She fakes her own death and takes on the identity of Black Thorn. She begins working as a vigilante in New York City where she met and fell in love with the Vigilante. For a time, her own methods are more brutal than even the Vigilante's own and they often argue. However, he goes insane and begins murdering innocent people, including cops. In a brief moment of clarity, the Vigilante commits suicide.

Black Thorn is devastated. She is later brought into the Checkmate organization by Harry Stein. There she comes into opposition with Amanda Waller, but then pretty much everyone does.

Black Thorn is sent, along with Checkmate, Suicide Squad and other operatives, to oppose Kobra's plan to kill millions of people from an orbiting alien vessel. The mission succeeds, though many on both sides die.

Black Thorn is still at least semi-active, as she assists Wonder Woman and a whole host of female heroes against the forces of Circe in New York City.

External links
DCU Guide: Black Thorn

References

Characters created by Paul Kupperberg
Comics characters introduced in 1987
DC Comics female superheroes
DC Comics martial artists